Serdivan is a second level municipality and an ilçe (district) in Sakarya Province, Turkey

It constitutes the western part of Greater Sakarya. 

Serdivan was established as a village in the 17th century during the Ottoman Empire era primarily with Greek population. Its former name was Petrades. However according to the compulsory population exchange agreement Greek population left the village and the Turks from Greece were settled in the village. Later other Turkish immigrants in 1928  from Albania, in 1934 from Bulgaria and in 1951 from Yugoslavia were also settled in the village. As the population increased it merged to the province center (Adapazarı) which is close to Serdivan. In 2002 it was declared an ilçe within the Greater Sakarya.

There are 14 neighborhoods and 10 villages in the ilçe. As of 2016 the population of Serdivan (including the rural area)  is  120731.

References

Districts of Sakarya Province
2002 establishments in Turkey